The Morocco–Congo Treaty was signed on 4 November 1911 in Berlin between France and Germany to recognize French domination of Morocco.  This event concluded the Agadir Crisis. In it, France ceded parts of the French Congo and French Equatorial Africa to Germany, comprising the Neukamerun.

Sources
KAISER'S SON SHOWS ANGER AT TREATY; Openly Applauds Criticism of German Backdown by Members of Reichstag.  Nov 10th, 1911.  New York Times

External links
 

1911 in Morocco
History of Africa
Kamerun
Treaties involving territorial changes
1911 in Africa
Treaties concluded in 1911
Treaties of the German Empire
Treaties of the French Third Republic
France–Germany relations